Bergues-sur-Sambre (literally Bergues on Sambre) is a commune in the department of Aisne in Hauts-de-France in the northern part of France.

Population

See also
Communes of the Aisne department

References

Communes of Aisne
Aisne communes articles needing translation from French Wikipedia